The Loft is a Danish music and sampling group formed in 1997.

The members are Jakob Weise Hellum and Martin Bøge Pedersen. In Denmark they had a major hit with "City of Dreams" in 2004. The second single "Forever" became a minor hit. The duo's debut album was No Ordinary Man released in August 2004.

Their second album was Little Paul's BLVD in 2008, with single "Kiss You Goodbye" making it to the Top 20. There were two other releases, "Pussycat Lounge" and "Flaming Lips".

Discography

Albums
All positions in parentheses in the Danish Albums Chart 
2004: No Ordinary Man (#9)
2008: Little Paul's BLVD

Singles
All positions in parentheses in the Danish Singles Chart 
2004: "City of Dreams" (#1)
2008: "Kiss You Goodbye" (#12)

References

External links
 The Loft Official website
 The Loft Myspace profile

Danish musical groups